Cottonwood is a neighborhood in the Town of Parker, Colorado. A former census-designated place (CDP), the population was 931 at the 2000 census.

Geography

Climate
This climate type is usually found in the outskirts of true deserts in low-latitude, semiarid regions.  It has a cooler, wetter winter resulting from the higher latitude and mid-latitude frontal cyclone activity. Annual precipitation totals are greater than in tropical and subtropical desert climates. Yearly variations in amount are not as extreme as in the true deserts but are nevertheless large. The Köppen Climate Classification subtype for this climate is "BSk". (Tropical and Subtropical Steppe Climate).

See also

Outline of Colorado
Index of Colorado-related articles
State of Colorado
Colorado cities and towns
Colorado census designated places
Colorado counties
Douglas County, Colorado
List of statistical areas in Colorado
Front Range Urban Corridor
North Central Colorado Urban Area
Denver-Aurora-Boulder, CO Combined Statistical Area
Denver-Aurora-Broomfield, CO Metropolitan Statistical Area

References

External links

Douglas County website
Douglas County School info

Unincorporated communities in Douglas County, Colorado
Former census-designated places in Colorado
Unincorporated communities in Colorado
Denver metropolitan area